The 1999 State of Origin series saw the 18th year that the annual three-game series between the Queensland and New South Wales representative rugby league football teams was contested entirely under 'state of origin' selection rules. The series was drawn and the shield retained by the previous year's victors, Queensland. Each team claimed victory in a game and the deciding fixture finished at 10-all. It was the first series to end in a draw.



Game I

Game I was a dour affair played in hot and steamy conditions at Suncorp Stadium with Queensland scraping in 9-8. The match was memorable for winger Mat Rogers' debut. Despite straining a ligament and being forced from the field, the gutsy flanker returned to score all of Maroons' points including a field goal (the first of his career) six minutes from game's end to win the encounter.

Game II

Game II was played at the new Olympic venue, Stadium Australia, in driving rain and in front of a record crowd. Manly captain, Geoff Toovey returned to the hooking position for NSW after not being selected for Game I. The conditions implied it would be another dour battle, but it turned out otherwise. Melbourne Storm fullback Robbie Ross grabbed his own piece of Origin history by scoring the fastest try in Origin after just 42 seconds. It temporarily took the wind out of the sails of Kevin Walters' Maroons.

All the scoring was done in the first half with a try to Rogers and conversion which put Queensland momentarily in front before Laurie Daley, making his final Origin appearance in Sydney, tore onto an Andrew Johns pass and scored under the posts. Sideline commentator, Steve Roach, commented during the telecast that the difference between the two teams was the return of Toovey, who kept the opposing "markers honest" and whose delivery from hooker to his halves' partners was sublime throughout the soggy affair. After the match, and in company with other NSW retirees Paul Harragon and Andrew Ettingshausen, Daley completed a lap of honour.

Game III

Game III played at Suncorp in treacherous wet conditions, featured plenty of dropped ball, but some of the skills on show made up for the errors. NSW captain, Brad Fittler was unavailable due to undergoing groin surgery earlier in the month. Laurie Daley once again demonstrated his prowess by miraculously scooping up a ball at his feet and off-loading to Terry Hill who then sent Matt Geyer over. Queensland's Paul Green somehow found his way through Ben Kennedy and Luke Ricketson to score and with Lockyer's conversion the Maroons led 6-4.

Adrian Lam whose club doctor at the Sydney Roosters had refused to allow him to play because of a dislocated shoulder, was cleared to play for Queensland and proved his worth by squeezing out a miracle pass to put Lockyer over. Geyer then scored for the Blues after an unlikely kick through by prop Rodney Howe to level the scores. Queensland, knowing a draw would be enough to retain the shield, had no interest in a field goal and put all their energy into holding New South Wales out.

The Blues were almost there until an inside pass from Daley to Ross went to ground.

New South Wales squad

Queensland squad

See also
1999 NRL season

References

Sources
 Big League's 25 Years of Origin Collectors' Edition, News Magazines, Surry Hills, Sydney

State of Origin series
State of Origin series